Sir William Morgan  (12 September 1828 – 2 November 1883) was the Premier of South Australia between 1878 and 1881.

Early life
William Morgan was born in Wilshamstead, Bedfordshire, England, the son of George Morgan, a farmer, and his wife Sarah Morgan (née Horne). Educated at Bedford Modern School, Morgan emigrated to South Australia, arriving in Port Adelaide on 13 February 1849 in the Glenelg. Initially he worked on land near the Murray River, his life was saved by an Indigenous Australian named Ranembe, whose name Morgan gave later to one of his sons. Then Morgan worked for Boord Brothers grocers; and at the beginning of 1852 he went to the Victorian gold rush. He had modest success, returned to Adelaide, and with a brother he purchased the Boord's business, establishing William Morgan & Co. and made it a successful enterprise. In 1865 he became a founder of the Bank of Adelaide. He founded, with Charles Hawkes Todd Connor and William Dening Glyde the firm of Morgan, Connor & Glyde, wheat and flour merchants of 43 King William Street. Glyde's brother Samuel Dening Glyde joined the company and soon became a partner.  In 1882 they joined a consortium, the Adelaide Milling and Mercantile Company, with John Hart & Co., W. Duffield & Co., James Cowan & Co. and Harrold Brothers; Morgan was their foundation Chairman.

Political career
Morgan was elected to the South Australian Legislative Council in August 1867, and was chief secretary in the second James Boucaut government from June 1875 to March 1876. He was chief secretary again in the fourth Boucaut ministry from October 1877 to September 1878, and when Boucaut became a judge, Morgan reconstructed the ministry and on 27 September 1878 became premier and chief secretary. This ministry was in office for nearly three years but it did not have an easy passage. One important measure passed was that providing deep drainage for Adelaide, the first city in Australia to have a proper sewerage system. A public trustee act was passed, and there was some railway extension, but other bills were rejected by the council.

Late life
Pressure of private business, including bad investments in New Caledonia, resulted in Morgan's resignation on 24 June 1881, and the John Bray ministry came in.  He was created K.C.M.G. in 1883. In May that year Morgan left Australia on a visit to England and he died suddenly on 2 November at Brighton, Sussex, aged 55.

Morgan was a self-made man who had liberal opinions. He was an avid free-trader who held that protective duties taxed the people least able to bear the burden. He was an excellent speaker, able administrator and might have had a more important place in South Australian politics if he had lived longer.

Family
On 8 July 1854 Morgan married Harriett, daughter of Thomas Matthews of Hurd's Hill, Coromandel Valley; together they had nine children. Harriet survived him with two sons and two daughters, including:
Dr. Alexander Matheson Morgan MB (11 February 1867 – 18 October 1934) was a noted ornithologist. He married Myrtle Dutton Green, daughter of George Dutton Green, on 11 October 1905. 
William Matheson Morgan (9 November 1906 – 2 February 1972) mining engineer

References

 

|-

|-

|-

|-

|-

People educated at Bedford Modern School
Premiers of South Australia
Knights Commander of the Order of St Michael and St George
1828 births
1883 deaths
19th-century Australian politicians
English emigrants to colonial Australia
19th-century Australian businesspeople
Members of the South Australian Legislative Council